Brandner is a German surname. Notable people with the surname include:

Christoph Brandner (born 1975), Austrian professional hockey winger
Ferdinand Brandner (1903–1986), Austrian aerospace designer, S.S. Standartenführer in Nazi Germany
Gary Brandner (1933–2013), American horror author known for his werewolf themed trilogy of novels, The Howling
Hans Brandner (born 1949), German former luger who competed for West Germany from the early 1970s to the early 1980s
Josef Brandner (1915–1996), highly decorated panzer ace in the Wehrmacht during World War II
Karl Brandner (1898–1961), American artist who worked primarily in landscapes
Kaspar Brandner (1916–1984), highly decorated Oberjäger in the Wehrmacht during World War II
Klaus Brandner (politician) (born 1949), German politician and member of the SPD
Klaus Brandner (skier) (born 1990), German alpine ski racer
Patrik Brandner, Czech footballer
Stephan Brandner (born 1966), German politician

Fictional characters:
Achim Brandner, character on German soap opera Verbotene Liebe (Forbidden Love)
Arno Brandner, character on German soap opera Verbotene Liebe (Forbidden Love)
David Brandner, character on German soap opera Verbotene Liebe (Forbidden Love)
Fabian Brandner, character on German soap opera Verbotene Liebe (Forbidden Love)
Florian Brandner,  character on German soap opera Verbotene Liebe (Forbidden Love)
Jan Brandner, character on German soap opera Verbotene Liebe (Forbidden Love)
Jana Brandner, character on German soap opera Verbotene Liebe (Forbidden Love)
Katja Brandner, character on German soap opera Verbotene Liebe (Forbidden Love)
Lydia Brandner, character on German soap opera Verbotene Liebe (Forbidden Love)
Matthias Brandner, character on German soap opera Verbotene Liebe (Forbidden Love)
Paul Brandner, character on German soap opera Verbotene Liebe (Forbidden Love)

See also
Brandner E-300, Egyptian turbojet engine, developed for the Helwan HA-300 light jet fighter
Brander (disambiguation)
Brandler
Brandur
Branner (disambiguation)
Bronner

German toponymic surnames